Dominick Gauthier (born 31 August 1973) is a Canadian freestyle skier. He competed in the men's moguls event at the 1998 Winter Olympics.

References

External links
 

1973 births
Living people
Canadian male freestyle skiers
Olympic freestyle skiers of Canada
Freestyle skiers at the 1998 Winter Olympics
People from Lévis, Quebec
Sportspeople from Quebec